McGraw–Hill Building may refer to:

 330 West 42nd Street, a landmark building in Manhattan, New York City, built in 1930
 1221 Avenue of the Americas, in Manhattan, New York City, built in 1969
 McGraw–Hill Building (Chicago), a landmark building in Chicago, Illinois

See also
 McGraw-Hill (disambiguation)
 McGraw Hill Financial
 McGraw–Hill Education